Thamarai Nenjam is a 1968 Indian Tamil-language romantic drama film written and directed by K. Balachander. The film stars Gemini Ganesan, B. Saroja Devi and Vanisri, with Major Sundarrajan and Nagesh playing supporting roles. It was released on 31 May 1968, and won two Tamil Nadu State Film Awards: Best Film (Third Prize) and Best Dialogue Writer (Balachander). The film was remade in Telugu as Mooga Prema (1969), in Hindi as Haar Jeet (1972) and in Kannada as Mugila Mallige (1985) by Balachander himself.

Plot 

Two friends, Kamala and Radha, falling in love with Murali, only for Kamala ending up helping Radha and Murali get together. However, when Radha finds out about this, she feels guilty and starts pushing away Murali towards Kamala thereby turning all three lives into hell. In the end, Kamala, who serialises her story in a weekly magazine through which Radha figures it out, concludes that the only way to resolve this is to kill herself. Does she succeed?

Cast 
 B. Saroja Devi as Kamala
 Gemini Ganesan as Murali
 Vanisri as Radha
 Major Sundarrajan as Vasudevan
 Nagesh as Narayanan
 S. N. Lakshmi as Narayanan's Mother
 Master Prabhakar as prabhakar
 Baby Kausalya as kausalya
 Baby Raji as Raji
 R. Sundaramoorthy as Sundaramoorthy

Production 
C. R. Vijayakumari was offered to act in the film, but did not accept, resulting in B. Saroja Devi replacing her.<ref>{{Cite web |date=25 July 2017 |title=கே.பாலசந்தரின் "தாமரை நெஞ்சம்{{}} விஜயகுமாரிக்கு பதில் சரோஜாதேவி நடித்தார் |url=https://www.maalaimalar.com/Cinema/CineHistory/2017/07/25215430/1098503/cinima-history-vijayakumari.vpf |url-status=live |archive-url=https://web.archive.org/web/20190601054010/https://www.maalaimalar.com/Cinema/CineHistory/2017/07/25215430/1098503/cinima-history-vijayakumari.vpf |archive-date=1 June 2019 |access-date=13 July 2022 |website=Maalai Malar |language=ta}}</ref>

 Soundtrack 
The soundtrack was composed by M. S. Viswanathan and lyrics were written by Kannadasan.

 Release and reception Thamarai Nenjam was released on 31 May 1968, and favourably reviewed by Kalki''. The film won the Tamil Nadu State Film Award for Best Film (Third Prize), and Balachander won the award for Best Dialogue Writer.

References

External links 
 

1960s female buddy films
1968 romantic drama films
1960s Tamil-language films
1968 films
Films directed by K. Balachander
Films scored by M. S. Viswanathan
Films with screenplays by K. Balachander
Indian black-and-white films
Indian female buddy films
Indian romantic drama films
Tamil films remade in other languages